"Love You Better" is a song by American rapper Future from his ninth studio album I Never Liked You (2022). It was sent to rhythmic contemporary radio on July 26, 2022, as the fourth single from the album.

Composition
"Love You Better" is a breakup song that contains a "chopped-up" vocal sample and croons from Future, who sings to his former lover, "Hope you can find someone to love you better than I did". Alphonse Pierre of Pitchfork described that in the lyrics, Future "sounds like he's apologizing to a girlfriend but is really trying to manipulate her into feeling sorry for him".

Critical reception
In his Pitchfork review of I Never Liked You, Alphonse Pierre had a mixed reaction to the song, regarding it as the album's best representation of Future's new music sounding just like his older music but not as good as it was before. Pierre commented, "It sounds nice, but I feel indifferent. The heartbreak doesn't have to be real, but it has to feel genuine, and with Future it just doesn't anymore."

Music video
The official music video was released on July 21, 2022. It features Future in clown makeup and feeling sorrow while his ex-partner (played by actress Shannon Thornton) enjoys her life with her new boyfriend. The video begins with a billboard advertising the song and another one featuring a "nondescript" football player referencing NFL player Russell Wilson, who is married to singer Ciara, Future's ex-girlfriend in real life. The couple is seen walking in front of their mansion home and taking photos with their young daughter, and in another scene Future's ex shares her secrets with a group of women.

Charts

References

2022 singles
2022 songs
Future (rapper) songs
Songs written by Future (rapper)
Epic Records singles
Songs written by ATL Jacob